Hammerl is a German surname. Notable people with the surname include:

Anton Hammerl (1969–2011) South African photojournalist
Franz Hammerl (1919–2001), German footballer
László Hammerl (born 1942), Hungarian sports shooter
Walter Hammerl

See also
Josef Hamerl (born 1931), Austrian football player
Hämmerli (surname)

German-language surnames